Inés Marín (born 19 April 2001) is a Chilean swimmer. She competed in the women's 100 metre freestyle event at the 2018 FINA World Swimming Championships (25 m), in Hangzhou, China.

References

External links
 

2001 births
Living people
Chilean female freestyle swimmers
Place of birth missing (living people)